Sclater's lark (Spizocorys sclateri) is a species of lark in the family Alaudidae. It is found in Namibia and South Africa. Its natural habitat is subtropical or tropical dry shrubland. It is threatened by habitat loss.

Taxonomy and systematics
The common name and the Latin binomial commemorate the British zoologist Philip Lutley Sclater.

Sclater's Lark was originally placed within the genus Calandrella and some authorities continue to recognize that classification. This species is alternately named as Sclater's short-toed lark.

References

External links

Species text - The Atlas of Southern African Birds

Sclater's lark
Birds of Southern Africa
Sclater's lark
Sclater's lark
Taxonomy articles created by Polbot